Calliostoma iridium, common name the Panama rainbow top shell, is a species of sea snail, a marine gastropod mollusk in the family Calliostomatidae.

Description
The height of the shell attains 19 mm.

Distribution
This marine species occurs in the Gulf of Panama and off Pacific Colombia at depths between 230 m and 280 m.

References

 W.H. Dall (1896) Diagnoses  of new species of mollusks from the West Coast of America; Proceedings of the U.S. National Museum XVIII, 1895, p. 7-20

External links
 To Biodiversity Heritage Library (10 publications)
 To GenBank (4 nucleotides; 1 proteins)
 To USNM Invertebrate Zoology Mollusca Collection
 To World Register of Marine Species
 

iridium
Gastropods described in 1896